The Constitution of the Islamic Republic of Iran (Qanun-e Asasi-ye Jomhuri-ye Eslâmi-ye Iran) was adopted by referendum on 2 and 3 December 1979, and went into force replacing the Constitution of 1906. It has been amended once, on 28 July 1989. The constitution has been called a "hybrid" of "theocratic and democratic elements". Articles One and Two vest sovereignty in God; but article Six "mandates popular elections for the presidency and the Majlis, or parliament." However, main democratic procedures and rights are subordinate to the Guardian Council and the Supreme Leader, whose powers are spelled out in Chapter Eight (Articles 107–112).

History

Over the  course of the  year 1978 a cycle  of "provocation, repression, and polarization" in political unrest worsened in Iran.   It became more and more  clear that the Pahlavi regime in Iran was likely to fall and that the leader of the revolution taking his regime down was Ayatollah Ruhollah Khomeini.  Work began on a constitution for the new Islamic state to follow the revolution. A preliminary draft  (modeled on the 1958 constitution of the French Fifth Republic) was (according to Asghar Schirazi)  begun in Paris by one Hasan Habibi while Khomeini was still in exile there. An outline was  presented to Khomeini in January 1979 and he brought it with him when he returned to Iran.  After being reworked by  two different commissions, it was published on 14 June 1979 by the provisional government of Mehdi Bazargan as the official preliminary draft of the constitution. 

The preliminary draft differed from the final version of the constitution in a number of ways. It made no reference to velayat-e faqih, and did not "reserve any special posts for Islamic jurists" except on  the guardian council where they made up a minority and were to be approved by the parliament from a  list drawn up  by the "highest religious authorities". 

Despite this, Khomeini made "only two small changes (in part to bar women from the presidency and judgeships)",
in the draft, and publicly stated his approval of the draft "on more than one occasion",  declaring at one point that it "must be approved quickly". The Council of the Islamic Revolution approved of it unanimously after examination and "declared it to be the official preliminary draft of the Revolutionary Council". The revolutionaries' original plan was to have a Constituent Assembly of hundreds of people  write the new constitution, but 
with this broad support for the preliminary draft, there now seemed to be a  consensus in favor of  a much more streamlined completion. An "Assembly of Experts" of only a few dozen  members would go over the text and "present it for final ratification in a national referendum".
During a joint summit between the members of the provisional government and the Superieur Council of Revolution with the presence of Khomeini in Qom, it was decided that an  Assembly for the Final Review of the Constitution was to be established   for a final evaluation of the constitution of Iran.

The assembly members  were voted  on in the summer of 1979.  Out of the "72 delegates whose election was officially recognized,  55 were clerics", almost all of them following "the line of the Imam", i.e. Khomeini loyalists. (Other delegates were from different minorities of religions, scientists, Athletes.)

What happened next is disputed. Schirazi writes that Khomeini then announced that the job of "determining whether or not" the constitution was "in conformity with Islamic requirements" was "exclusively reserved for revered jurists", to the surprise of those outside his network.  Also at odds with previous statements was that the Assembly for the Final Review of the Constitution (dominated by Khomeini supporters) did not quickly approve the draft but rewrote it, adding a Guardian Jurist (wali-e faqih) leader with powers over other branches of government, and significantly increasing  the power of the Council of Guardians. The offices of the President and the Prime Minister were retained for the executive branch of government from the French model.

A different  version of  events comes from Shaul Bakhash, who writes that Khomeini and his supporters accepted the preliminary  draft but were  provoked by an "opposition determined to establish a secular state".
 A secularist group called "A Seminar on the People's Expectations from the Constitution" called for changes in the draft: "a ceremonial president, supremacy of parliament, independent judiciary, individual rights, and equal rights for women, proposed making the universal declaration of Human Rights part of the constitution, more decentralization, and `democratization` of the army".  This led "Khomeini to spur the Islamic groups to counterattack', telling a 
telling his supporters that determining whether articles of the constitution meet Islamic criteria `lies within the exclusive jurisdiction of the leading Islamic jurists.` non-jurists should not get involved.
"It quickly became clear to Khomeini and his lieutenants that there existed considerable support and no mass opposition to the doctrine and that the constitution could serve to institutionalize both the supremacy of the faqih and clerical rule."  The idea that Khomeini "should be entrusted with supreme authority under the constitution" was brought up by provincial clerics in the Assembly and was quickly embraced by the Assembly.

The assembly worked for sixty-seven sessions and in four rounds. The first round was considered with a preliminary evaluating of principles. The second round considered with providing principles in groups.  The third round dealt with approbation of principles and the fourth round with investigation of all collection of principles. 

According to a  legal bill of council of revolution, the draft  was put  to a vote through a referendum, with voters  given the option of voting  yes or no. On 2-3 December 1979 Iranians voted, and the official result was over 99% in favor. (The vote was boycotted by some secular, leftist and Kurdish groups and total of 15,578,956  votes was almost 5 million less than the earlier referendum for an Islamic Republic.)

1989 Amendments

On 24 April 1989, Ayatollah Khomeini issued a decree convening an Assembly for Revising the Constitution. It made several changes in the constitution, in Articles 5, 107, 109, 111, eliminating the need for the Supreme Leader to be a marja chosen by popular acclaim.  It made permanent the Expediency Discernment Council to work out disagreements between the Parliament and Council of Guardians, and eliminated the post of Prime Minister. The amendments were thought to be established because no marja had given strong support for Khomeini's policies. The amendments were approved by the voting public on 28 July 1989 (in same election as Akbar Hashemi Rafsanjani was elected to the first of two terms as President of Iran).

Preamble
The constitution begins by stating that the "anti-despotic movement for constitutional government [1906-1911], and anti-colonialist movement for the nationalization of petroleum" in the 1950s failed because of lack of religious coloring thereunder.  Moreover, the "central axis" of the theocracy shall be Quran and hadith.

The preamble further states: "The Assembly of Experts for Constitution...fram[ed] the Constitution...[after input] by the government...with the hope that this century will witness the establishment of a universal holy government and the downfall of all others." (See also: Mahdi and Mohammed al-Mahdi)

Chapter I [Article 1 to 14]:  General Principles

Article 1 (Form of Government)
Article 1 states that the form of Government in Iran is that of an Islamic Republic. It explains this form is due to the referendum passed by 98% of the eligible voters of Iran and gives credit to Imam Khomeini for the victorious revolution.

Article 2 (Foundation Principles)
Article 2 defines an Islamic Republic as a system based on the belief in:
 the One Allah (as stated in the phrase "There is no god except Allah"), His exclusive sovereignty and right to legislate, and the necessity of submission to His commands;
 divine revelation and its fundamental role in setting forth the laws;
 the return to Allah in the Hereafter, and the constructive role of this belief in the course of man's ascent towards Allah;
 the justice of Allah in creation and legislation;
 continuous leadership and perpetual guidance, and its fundamental role in ensuring the uninterrupted process of the revolution of Islam;
 the exalted dignity and value of man, and his freedom coupled with responsibility before God; in which equity, justice, political, economic, social, and cultural independence, and national solidarity are secured by recourse to:
 continuous leadership of the holy persons, possessing necessary qualifications, exercised on the basis of the Quran and the Sunnah, upon all of whom be peace;
 sciences and arts and the most advanced results of human experience, together with the effort to advance them further;
 negation of all forms of oppression, both the infliction of and the submission to it, and of dominance, both its imposition and its acceptance.

Article 3 (State Goals)
Article 3 states the objective of the Islamic Republic is to direct all of its resources to a number of goals. These goals cover general topics in governance. For example:
 Support good moral values based on faith
 Fight all forms of vice and corruption
 Raise public awareness through the proper use of the mass media and press
 Free education
 Free physical training
 Strengthening advanced scientific research
 The elimination of imperialism and foreign influence
 The elimination of despotism, autocracy and monopoly
 Ensure social and political freedoms within the law
 The end to all forms of undesirable discrimination

These goals were designed to emphasize positive liberty.

Some of the goals are put in context of the requirements of Islam. For example:
 The planning of a just economic system
 Public cooperation of all people
 The creation of the government's foreign policy

Commentary

The principles of faith and piety are necessary conditions of creating a good society. Therefore, that is needed some initiative actions such as cleaning the environment. That action is to policies like codification of rules of social justice and removing any type of social gap; creating the administrative system; reformation of judicial system according to Islamic regulations. Reducing the phenomena of being illiterate; rejecting the tyranny and being participated of all people in all affairs and Refinement of souls.

Article 4 (Islamic Principle)
Article 4 is immutable and the Council of Guardians ensures that all articles of the Constitution as well other laws are based on Islamic criteria.

Article 5 (Office of Religious Leader)
This article explains the leaders of Ummah must choose a leader in accordance with Article 107 for this office. This is stated to be related to the disappearance of the Twelfth Imam whom it asks God to return.

Chapter II [Article 15 to 18]:  The Official Language, Script, Calendar, and Flag of the Country

Official Language
Article 15 states that the "Official language and writing script (of Iran)... is Persian ...[and]... the use of regional and tribal languages in the press and mass media, as well as for teaching of their literature in schools, is allowed in addition to Persian."
Per Article 16, "Since the language of the Qur'an and Islamic texts ... is Arabic it must be taught ... in school from elementary grades until the end of high school."

Chapter III [Article 19 to 42]:  The Rights of the People
Article 23 of the Iranian constitution holds that “the investigation of individuals’ beliefs is forbidden, and no one may be molested or taken to task simply for holding a certain belief.”

Article 24 "Publications and the press are free to discuss issues unless such is deemed harmful to the principles of Islam or the rights of the public. The law shall determine the details of this exception."

Article 27 provides for freedom of assembly, "provided arms are not carried" and the assemblies "are not detrimental to the fundamental principles of Islam".

Article 37 provides for the presumption of innocence, stating: "Innocence is to be presumed, and no one is to be held guilty of a charge unless his or her guilt has been established by a competent court."

Article 29 [Welfare benefits] is a universal right of all to enjoy social insurance or other forms of security for retirement, unemployment, old-age disability, lack of guardianship, being a wayfarer, accident and the need for health and treatment services and medical care. The government, in accordance with the laws and by drawing on national revenues, is required to provide such insurance and economic protection to each and every citizen of the country.

Chapter IV [Article 43 to 55]:  Economy and Financial Affairs
Article 44: The Islamic Republic is not a Communist state as the Islamic scholars fiercely oppose this.  Notwithstanding this, pursuant to Article 44, "all large-scale and mother industries, foreign trade, major minerals, banking, insurance, power generation, dams, and large-scale irrigation networks, radio and television, post, telegraph and telephone services, aviation, shipping, roads, railroads and the like" are entirely owned by the government. According to the Article 44 of the Iranian Constitution, the economy of Iran is to consist of three sectors: state, cooperative, and private; and is to be based on systematic and sound planning. This article has been amended in 2004 to allow for the Privatization of the Iranian economy.

Article 49: The government has the responsibility of confiscating all wealth accumulated through usury, usurpation, bribery, embezzlement, theft, gambling, misuse of endowments, misuse of government contracts and transactions, the sale of uncultivated lands and other resources subject to public ownership, the operation of centers of corruption, and other illicit means and sources, and restoring it to its legitimate owner; and if no such owner can be identified, it must be entrusted to the public treasury.  This rule must be executed by the government with due care, after investigation and furnishing necessary evidence in accordance with the law of Islam.

Article 50: This article links current and future generations to the environment and makes it a public duty to protect the environment. This article explicitly forbids economic activity that degrades or causes irreversible harm to the environment.

Chapter V [Article 56 to 61]: The Right of National Sovereignty
Pursuant to Article 60, the president fulfills "executive" functions "except in the matters that are directly placed under the jurisdiction of the [Leader]" as enumerated in Article 110. Article 68 allows suspension of elections during wartime.
Article 57 states the Separation of Powers

Chapter VI [Article 62 to 99]:  The Legislative Powers

Article 81 [Foreign Business]
This article forbids multinational corporations from taking over certain businesses in Iran saying, "concessions to foreigners or the formation of companies" in Iran is forbidden.

Chapter VII [Article 100 to 106]:  Councils
Article 100
In order to expedite social, economic, development, public health, cultural, and educational programmes and facilitate other affairs relating to public welfare with the cooperation of the people according to local needs, the administration of each village, division, city, municipality, and province will be supervised by a council to be named the Village, Division, City, Municipality, or Provincial Council. Members of each of these councils will be elected by the people of the locality in question. Qualifications for the eligibility of electors and candidates for these councils, as well as their functions and powers, the mode of election, the jurisdiction of these councils, the hierarchy of their authority, will be determined by law, in such a way as to preserve national unity, territorial integrity, the system of the Islamic Republic, and the sovereignty of the central government.

Article 101
In order to prevent discrimination in the preparation of programmes for the development and welfare of the provinces, to secure the cooperation of the people, and to arrange for the supervision of coordinated implementation of such programmes, a Supreme Council of, the Provinces will be formed, composed of representatives of the Provincial Councils. Law will specify the manner in which this council is to be formed and the functions that it is to fulfil.

Article 102
The Supreme Council of the Provinces has the right within its jurisdiction, to draft bills and to submit them to the Islamic Consultative Assembly, either directly or through the government. These bills must be examined by the Assembly.

Article 103
Provincial governors, city governors, divisional governors, and other officials appointed by the government must abide by all decisions taken by the councils within their jurisdiction.

Article 104
In order to ensure Islamic equity and cooperation in chalking out the programmes and to bring about the harmonious progress of all units of production, both industrial and agricultural, councils consisting of the representatives of the workers, peasants, other employees, and managers, will be formed in educational and administrative units, units of service industries, and other units of a like nature, similar councils will be formed, composed of representatives of the members of those units. The mode of the formation of these councils and the scope of their 'functions and powers' are to be specified by law.

Article 105
Decisions taken by the councils must not be contrary to the criteria of Islam and the laws of the country.

Article 106
The councils may not be dissolved unless they deviate from their legal duties. The body responsible for determining such deviation, as well as the manner for dissolving the councils and re-forming them, will be specified by law. Should a council have any objection to its dissolution, it has the right to appeal to a competent court, and the court is duty-bound to examine its complaint outside the docket sequence.

Chapter VIII [Article 107 to 112]:  The Leader or Leadership Council

Article 110 [Leadership Duties and Powers]
The constitution accords many powers to the Supreme Leader.

Some say that the Supreme Leader's powers extend beyond those enumerated in the Constitution because he can use "Islamic issues for justification."

Article 112:  If a proposed bill of Majles is "against the principles of Shariah or the Constitution," then the Guardian Council should meet with the Expediency Council to resolve the legislative deadlock.

Chapter IX [Article 113 to 151]:  The Executive Power

Article 146 [No Foreign Military Bases]
"...[F]oreign military bases in Iran, even for peaceful purposes, is forbidden."

Chapter X [Article 152 to 155]: Foreign Policy
Article 152: The foreign policy of the Islamic Republic of Iran is based upon the rejection of all forms of domination, both the exertion of it and submission to it, the preservation of the independence of the country in all respects and its territorial integrity, the defence of the rights of all Muslims, non-alignment with respect to the hegemonic superpowers, and the maintenance of mutually peaceful relations with all non-belligerent States.

Article 153: Any form of agreement resulting in foreign control over the natural resources, economy, army, or culture of the country, as well as other aspects of the national life, is forbidden.

Article 154: The Islamic Republic of Iran has as its ideal human felicity throughout human society, and considers the attainment of independence, freedom, and rule of justice and truth to be the right of all people of the world. Accordingly, while scrupulously refraining from all forms of interference in the internal affairs of other nations, it supports the just struggles of the Mustad'afun (oppressed) against the Mustakbirun (oppressors) in every corner of the globe.

Article 155: The government of the Islamic Republic of Iran may grant political asylum to those who seek it unless they are regarded as traitors and saboteurs according to the laws of Iran.

Chapter XI [Article 156 to 174]:  The Judiciary

Islamic laws & Verdicts
Article 167 [Rule of Law for Judiciary] stipulates that judges must make use of "Islamic sources and...verdicts " in matters where the Iranian law books are silent.

Chapter XII [Article 175]:  Radio & Television 
This article guarantees the freedom of expression and dissemination of thoughts in the "Radio and Television of the Islamic Republic of Iran" when keeping with the Islamic criteria and best interests of the country.  It gives the Leader the power to appoint and dismiss the head of the "Radio and Television of the Islamic Republic of Iran" and establishes a council with two representatives (six in total) from each branch of the government to supervise this organization.

Chapter XIII [Article 176]: Supreme Council for National Security
Chapter 8, which has only one article, establishes Iran's National Security Council.

Chapter XIV [Article 177]:  The Revision of the Constitution
This article regulates the process for revising the Constitution and puts a moratorium on revisions to particular aspects of the Constitution.  Absent its own repeal, Article 177 requires an edict by the Leader to initiate the process of making future revisions to the Constitution.

Itself a revision to the Constitution, Article 177 necessitates a “Council for Revision of the Constitution” to make future amendments to the Constitution.  This panel's membership is exclusively governmental officials beyond the advice of 3 university professors.  The final amendments are put to referendum in a process initiated by the executive unlike Article 59 referendum which must be approved by a supermajority of the Islamic Consultative Assembly.
The article further stipulates that particular aspects of the Constitution are unalterable: the Islamic character of government and laws, the objectives of the republic, the democratic character of the government, “the absolute wilayat al-'amr and the leadership of the Ummah”, the administration of the country by referendum, and the official religion of Islam.

See also

 1989 Iranian constitutional referendum
 Blasphemy laws of the Islamic Republic of Iran
 December 1979 Iranian constitutional referendum
 Iran Constitution of 1906
 Iranian Islamic Republic Day
 Iranian Revolution
 List of members of Constitutional Amendment Council of Iran
 Politics of Iran
 Sharia

References and notes

External links

 Constitution of Iran (in Persian), Ministry of Interior, Iran
 Constitution of Iran, as an unofficial English translation hosted at University of Bern, Switzerland (with good summaries)
 Islamic Republic of Iran Constitution from parstimes.com
 Islamic Republic of Iran Constitution
 An article on the Constitution of the Islamic Republic of Iran from the Encyclopaedia Iranica
 Iran Chamber Society
 Iran Law Library
 http://www.helplinelaw.com/law/iran/constitution/constitution02.php
 https://web.archive.org/web/20070929082837/http://www.ibchamber.org/lawreg/constitution.htm
 https://web.archive.org/web/20170918102549/http://www.alaviandassociates.com/documents/constitution.pdf
 Iran Electoral Archive - Iranian Constitution
 Nourlaw.com - Database of Iranian laws and regulations - 2017

Government of the Islamic Republic of Iran
1979 in law
Law of Iran
Iranian Revolution
1979 documents
1979 in politics
December 1979 events in Asia
Islamic
1979 in Iran
1970s in Iran